Cantal (or ) is a department in the Auvergne-Rhône-Alpes region of France, with its prefecture in Aurillac. Its other principal towns are Saint-Flour (the episcopal see) and Mauriac; its residents are known as Cantalians ( or ). Cantal borders the departments of Puy-de-Dôme, Haute-Loire, Aveyron, Lot, Lozère and Corrèze, in the Massif Central natural region.

Along with neighbouring Lozère and Creuse, Cantal is among the most sparsely populated and geographically isolated departments of France and Aurillac is the departmental capital farthest removed from a major motorway. It had a population of 144,692 in 2019, making it the country's 98th most populated department. Of the 96 metropolitan departments, it is the fifth least populated.

Etymology 
The department is named for the Plomb du Cantal, the central peak of the bare and rugged mounts of Cantal (French: Monts du Cantal) mountain chain which traverses the area.

Geography 

Cantal lies in the middle of France's central plateau. The Cantal range is a group of extinct and eroded volcanic peaks. Its neighbors are Puy Mary (elev. ) and Puy Chavaroche (elev. ).

The principal rivers are the Alagnon, which is tributary to the Allier; the Celle and Truyère, tributary to the Lot; and the Cère and Rhue, tributary to the Dordogne. The western area of the department consists of grassy plateaus and river valleys.

At first, Cantal was divided into four arrondissements—Aurillac, Mauriac, Saint-Flour and Murat (later merged with Saint-Flour).

Climate 
The climate of the department varies considerably. Prevailing winds and mountain ranges divide Cantal into four climatic zones:
 The west is subject to oceanic winds which bring rains.
 The mountains of the Cantal and the Cézallier create a rain shadow: it rains and snows quite often.
 The Planèze of Saint-Flour and the region of Massiac receive less precipitation, owing to winds coming from the north and south.
 The plateaux of the Margeride and the Aubrac have harsh winters and pleasant summers.

Generally, the weather is mild and dry in the alluvial plain between Murat and Saint-Flour and around Aurillac, while summer storms and winters can be long and severe in the northern and central areas. The west—nearer precipitation coming in from the Atlantic—is well watered. There is abundant snowfall which can remain up to six months on the mountaintops. Winter temperatures can fall to below , whereas in summer  is often reached.  The southern part of the department, on its borders with Aveyron and Lot, is the hottest region. Aurillac averaged 2080 hours of sunlight per year over the period from 1991 to 2000. Fog is rare and disappears quickly. Wind is usually not very strong, but the lightning flashes in this department are among the most spectacular in France.

Televised French weather forecasts often note Aurillac as the coldest city in France in the mornings.

Principal towns

The most populous commune is Aurillac, the prefecture. As of 2019, there are 5 communes with more than 3,000 inhabitants:

History 
The area of Cantal was historically part of the Haute-Auvergne.

Cantal is one of the original 83 departments created during the French Revolution on 4 March 1790. Prior to the First World War, it comprised parts of the XIII. Army Corps military region and the Clermont-Ferrand educational division.

Diocese of Cantal 
After the 1790 Constitution Civile du Clergé, the Diocese of Saint-Flour in Cantal (whose bishop refused to swear the republican oath of allegiance, constituting a schism from Rome) was among the almost half of the French sees being abolished to realign the new bishoprics to coincide with the new departments, such as Cantal, where outsider parish priest Anne-Alexandre-Marie Thibault was elected Bishop. It was formally abolished in turn after the Napoleonic Concordat of 1801 (Thibault refusing to resign), in favor of the reinstated bishopric of Saint Poul, but actually retained the departemental borders.

Economy 

The climate being generally too cool and damp for grain, much of Cantal is given over to pasture for Aubrac and Salers cattle, sheep, and, formerly, horses. This in turn supports a dairy industry responsible for butter and Roquefort cheese and the appellation-controlled cheeses Cantal, Salers, and Bleu d'Auvergne. Cantal is the French department with the greatest number of appellation-controlled cheeses, although proper Roquefort is now restricted to cheese produced in the Aveyron department. The region's mineral products include coal, copper, lead, iron, antimony, granite, slate and lime, but the department's isolation and poor infrastructure long precluded their exploitation. Before the First World War, the primary exports were livestock, cheese, butter, and coal and the main imports were coal, wine, grain, flour, and pottery. By then, it had been connected to both the Orleans and Midi railways.

Traditionally, many Cantalians roamed France during the year plying humble trades but now the area's relative lack of industry and development permits tourism. An area has been set aside as the Auvergne Volcanos Regional Park.

Demographics 
The Occitan language was historically spoken in Cantal.

The official population count for 2019 was 144,692. The population peaked at 262,117 in 1836. It has been below 200,000 for the last 90 years. The department has experienced a particularly drastic level of depopulation, although the phenomenon was a feature of many of the country's rural departments throughout the twentieth century, as agricultural wages failed to keep pace with those available in the industrialising regions outside the department.

Population development since 1791:

Tourism

Architecture

The department counts several remarkable buildings. Among them, the Romanesque religious buildings like the churches of Cheylade (eleventh century), Dieno or Massiac. The area's Catholic cathedral—dependent on the archdiocese of Bourges—is the 15th-century St Pierre de St-Flour, erected in the Gothic style.

 Castle of Val in Lanobre ( visitors/year)
 Castle of Anjony in Tournemire ( visitors/year)
 Castle of Pesteils in Polminhac ( visitors/year)
 Castle de la Vigne in Ally ( visitors/year)
 Castle of Clavières in Ayrens
 Castle of Carbonat in Arpajon-sur-Cère
 Chateau de Conros, near Aurillac

Festivals

 International Festival of Street Theatre, Aurillac.
 World Music Festival, Murat
 36 hours : Various little scenes with dances
 Festival International de Boogie Woogie, Laroquebrou

Art
The characteristic folk dance in Cantal is La Bourrée. In the countryside it would be danced in folk costumes with accompaniment by accordion. The dance form was long ago adapted for use in courtly music and features prominently in the Baroque dance suites of the seventeenth and eighteenth centuries.

Prominent museums in Cantal include:
 Museum of Art and Arqueologia, Aurillac ( visitors/year)
 The House of Fauna, Murat ( visitors/year)
 Museum of the Géothermia, Chaudes-Aigues ( visitors/year)
 Museum of the Volcanos, Aurillac ( visitors/year)
 Museum of the ray, Marcenat ( visitors/year)
 Museum of the "Haute Auvergne", Saint-Flour ( visitors/year)
 The House of the Chestnut Mourjou ( visitors/year)
 Museum of Georges Pompidou, Montboudif ( visitors/year)
 Museum of the Accordion in Siran
 Museum of Agriculture in Auvernia, Coltines

Cuisine 

The traditional articles of Cantalian cuisine were rye, buckwheat, and chestnuts, as well as ham, cheese, and vegetables. The area's simple recipes were designed to satisfy hill farmers and herders. Notable dishes include:

 Aligot (also in Aveyron): Creamed potatoes, cheese (fresh tomme), butter, fresh cream and a little garlic.
 Truffade: Potatoes in slices with cheese (fresh tomme) and a little garlic.
 Pounti: A cake made with dough of wheat black flour, herbs, lard, prunes and Swiss chard.
 The typical cheese Cantal, which can be chosen young, old or "entre-deux".

Outdoor activities
In the 19th century, the hills and valleys abounded with game and the streams with fish, the countryside producing a "vast variety" of aromatic and medicinal plants.

At present, the most visited places are Puy Mary, the Plomb du Cantal, the village of Salers, and the gorges of the Truyère (with the Garabit viaduct, the castle of Alleuze, and the towns of Boisset, Pierrefort). The Parc Naturel des Volcans d’Auvergne features several inactive volcanoes. Cantal also has numerous castles. Puy Mary can be accessed by car easily. and is accessible to hikers. It is also possible to hike to the nearby Puy de Peyre-Arse (1806 m). Le Lioran or Super-Lioran are the best places to start the hike. Le Lioran is accessible by rail or bus and Super-Lioran is just a kilometre away from Le Lioran. From Super-Lioran it is also possible to hike to Plomb du Cantal. There is also an option of taking the cable car to Plomb du Cantal from Super-Lioran. Super-Lioran tourist office has various hike routes in the region. There are also various adventure courses, dirt bikes, summer luges etc. that run in Super-Lioran.

Among the various activities offered in this department, the "Massif Cantalien" can be discovered through walking, horseback riding or mountain biking excursions (tracks are especially designed for this). Aquatic sports are also common, due to numerous lakes. The department also offers activities such as mountaineering, canoeing and fishing. The landscape also allows the practice of free flight: base jumpers frequent the sector around the Puy Mary and the Brezon valley.

Thanks to its terrain, Cantal can count on a good snow level, which allows winter sports. The station of Le Lioran, largest ski-resort of the Massif Central offers alpine skiing (with specific adaptations for snowboard) and ice-skating. Excursions in snow shoes are also possible. The department has several hundred kilometres of cross-country skiing tracks.

Politics
This staunchly Catholic department is an old stronghold of the French Right and was the electoral base of the late Georges Pompidou. Only the area around Aurillac, historically anti-clerical and Radical, has some left-wing support.

The current president of the departmental council is Bruno Faure (The Republicans).

Paul Doumer, French president from May 1931 to May 1932, was born in Aurillac in this department.

Current National Assembly Representatives

Notes

See also
Communes of the Cantal department

References
 

Attribution:

External links 

 Prefecture website
 Departmental Council website
 
 Cantal Tourism website

 
Massif Central
1790 establishments in France
Departments of Auvergne-Rhône-Alpes
States and territories established in 1790